Sharps Rifle Manufacturing Company was the manufacturer of the Sharps Rifle. The company was organized by Samuel Robbins and Richard S. Lawrence as a holding company in Hartford, Connecticut, on October 9, 1851 with $100,000 in capital. Despite Sharps departing from the company bearing his name, Sharps Rifle Manufacturing Company produced over 100,000 rifles, but it dissolved in 1881 with the widespread use of repeating rifles.

History

Christian Sharps (1810–1874), patented his rifle in 1848. The first contract for 5,000 rifles was in 1850 and manufacturing started in 1851. The Model 1851 "box-lock" was developed by Christian Sharps, Rollin White, and Richard Lawrence at Robbins & Lawrence of Windsor, Vermont. The second contract for 15,000 rifles was so large that no suitable land was available in Windsor, Vermont.  The holding company advanced Robbins & Lawrence $40,000 to purchase  of land in Hartford, Connecticut, and to erect a brick factory building.

Christian Sharps left the Company in 1853. He later formed a partnership with William Hankins in 1862, known as Sharps & Hankins. In 1855, manufacturing was moved to Hartford and continued until 1876. Operations were then moved to Bridgeport, Connecticut.

In 1872, Sharps introduced the .50-90 Sharps hunting cartridge. Hugo Borchardt designed the last rifle made by the company, the Sharps-Borchardt Model 1878, but the company went bankrupt and was defunct three years later in 1881.

The Sharps Rifle Manufacturing Company produced over 100,000 firearms during the US Civil War for the Union Army, but the company was plagued by lawsuits and eventually succumbed to a shifting marketplace as repeating rifles became more popular with shooters.

Legacy
Reproductions of the paper cartridge Sharps 1863 Rifle, the metallic cartridge 1874 Sharps Rifle, and Sharps-Borchardt Model 1878 are manufactured today for use in hunting and target shooting. A number of companies, among them Shiloh Rifle Manufacturing Company and C. Sharps Arms Co. Inc., both of Big Timber, Montana, and the Italian gunmaker Davide Pedersoli & Co. of Brescia, offer a line of Sharps reproductions.

The Sharps Rifle Manufacturing Company had manufactured bicycles under contract for Weed Sewing Machine Company in Hartford. When Sharps relocated to Bridgeport, Weed bought the old Hartford plant to manufacture bicycles themselves.

References

7.Marcot, Roy - Marron, Edward - Paxton, Ron. "Sharps Firearms: The Percussion Era 1848 - 1865"

Defunct firearms manufacturers
Firearm manufacturers of the United States
History of Connecticut
Companies based in Bridgeport, Connecticut
Defunct manufacturing companies based in Connecticut
Manufacturing companies based in Hartford, Connecticut
Privately held companies based in Connecticut
1851 establishments in Connecticut